Rinad Sultanovich Minvaleyev (born August 20, 1965 in Yaroslavl, Russian SFSR, Soviet Union) is a Russian physiologist, orientalist and researcher of the traditional health cаre systems, candidate of biological sciences, associate professor at the Chair of Physical Education and Sports, Saint-Petersburg State University, provost at the State National Institute of Health, the scientific worker of the A. A. Ukhtomsky Institute of Physiology.

He is an author of row of the scientific researches and publications, the best known of which are "the method of normalization of the human organism’s adaptive functional systems"  and the researches of the Tibetan yoga of tummo a.k.a. "the yoga of the inner heat"  (in collaboration with Ivanov A. I., candidate of physical and mathematical sciences, research associate at the Institute of Applied Mathematics n. a. Vladimir Zubov (Saint-Petersburg)). He is the scientific chief of yearly expeditions to Himalayas titled "Searching the Lost Knowledge". Rinad Minvaleyev has written the book "To Slim Without a Damage. Feature Articles of the Applied Physiology".

He is a propagandist of the physiologic approach to questions of soul and body recovery. He pays a lot of attention to dethronement of the health care  myths.

Bibliography

References

External links
"Physiology of Yoga", Rinad Minvaleyev's section at Realyoga.ru
Rinad Minvaleyev's forum

1965 births
Academic staff of Saint Petersburg State University
Living people
People from Yaroslavl
Russian psychologists